"Wouldn't Change a Thing" is a song performed by Demi Lovato with Joe Jonas from the 2010 Disney Channel television film  Camp Rock 2: The Final Jam. The song was released on July 23, 2010, as the fourth single from the album. In German-speaking countries, a version with Lovato and Stanfour was released on July 31. The song was featured in the episode "These Arms of Mine" from Grey's Anatomy and was performed by Alex Karev (Justin Chambers). "Wouldn't Change a Thing" was also featured on the 2010 karaoke video game Disney Sing It: Party Hits, where Lovato acted as the in-game vocal coach.

Track listings and formats
 International digital download
"Wouldn't Change a Thing" (Demi Lovato feat. Joe Jonas) – 3:23

 German CD single
"Wouldn't Change a Thing" (Demi Lovato feat. Stanfour) – 3:23
"Wouldn't Change a Thing" (Instrumental) – 3:23

 German digital download
"Wouldn't Change a Thing" (Demi Lovato feat. Stanfour) – 3:24

 Digital EP
"Wouldn't Change a Thing" (Demi Lovato feat. Stanfour) – 3:23
"Wouldn't Change a Thing" (Demi Lovato feat. Joe Jonas) – 3:23
"Wouldn't Change a Thing" (Instrumental) – 3:23
"Wouldn't Change a Thing" (Music video) – 3:23

Charts

Demi Lovato with Joe Jonas

Demi Lovato with Stanfour

Other versions

References

2010 singles
2010 songs
Demi Lovato songs
Joe Jonas songs
Camp Rock
Songs written by Peer Åström
Songs written by Adam Anders
Walt Disney Records singles
Pop ballads